David Diosa (born 4 December 1992) is a Colombian footballer who currently plays for Valley United FC in the National Independent Soccer Association (NISA).

Personal

Diosa was born in Medellin, Colombia and moved to the United States with his mother and sister when he was 11 years old. Diosa grew up in Jackson Heights and attended Martin Luther King High School.

Club career

In 2010, Diosa was a member of the New York Cosmos Academy Under-18 team. Diosa scored the first goal for a Cosmos side in 25 years when he scored for the U-18 team in a U.S. Soccer Development Academy match against Connecticut's South Central Premier. Diosa also scored in a match against Newtown Pride FC.

In 2011, he was a member of the New York Cosmos Under-23 that participated in the Premier Development League.

Professional career

Diosa signed with the New York Cosmos on July 5, 2013 and made his professional debut in the Cosmos’ 1–0 victory over Atlanta on November 2, 2013, when he played 38 minutes as a substitute.

Diosa scored his first professional goal on August 30, 2014 in the team's 2–2 draw at Indy Eleven. Diosa finished the 2014 season with one goal and one assist in nine appearances for the team. On December 3, 2015 it was announced that the Cosmos had signed Diosa to a contract extension.

In 2017, Diosa signed with OKC Energy FC, but was transferred back to the Cosmos a month later.

On April 6, 2021, Diosa was signed by National Independent Soccer Association side New Amsterdam FC ahead of the 2021 Spring NISA season.

References

External links
 New York Cosmos player profile
 NISA player profile

1992 births
Living people
Colombian footballers
Colombian expatriate footballers
People from Jackson Heights, Queens
New York Cosmos (2010) players
OKC Energy FC players
Real Monarchs players
Richmond Kickers players
New Amsterdam FC players
Association football forwards
Expatriate soccer players in the United States
North American Soccer League players
USL League One players
National Independent Soccer Association players
Soccer players from New York (state)
Footballers from Medellín